Wayne Ward (born 28 April 1964 in Colchester, England) is an English former footballer.

Career
Ward started his career with Colchester United in May 1982. He made 22 appearances for the club in the Football League before joining non-league side Tiptree United in 1983.

Notes

1964 births
Living people
Sportspeople from Colchester
English footballers
Association football fullbacks
Colchester United F.C. players
Tiptree United F.C. players